Plocamopherus ocellatus is a species of sea slug, a nudibranch, a shell-less marine gastropod mollusk in the family Polyceridae.

Distribution 
This species was originally described from the Red Sea.

References

Rüppell, E. & Leuckart, F.S., 1828. Neue wirbellose Thiere des Rothen Meeres. Atlas zu der Reise im nördlichen Afrika von Eduard Rüppell. Brunner, Frankfurt am Main. 1-22, pls 1-6.

External links 
 SeaSlug Forum info

Polyceridae
Gastropods described in 1828